Grevillea infecunda, commonly known as Anglesea grevillea, is a species of flowering plant in the family Proteaceae and is endemic to a restricted area of southern Victoria in Australia. It is a low-lying to weakly erect shrub with divided leaves with three to sixteen lobes or teeth and greenish-yellow flowers with a dull pink style.

Description
Flowering occurs from October to December but the plant is not known to produce fruit.

Taxonomy
Grevillea infecunda was first formally described in 1986 by Donald McGillivray in New Names in Grevillea (Proteaceae) from specimens collected in the Anglesea district by James Hamlyn Willis in 1969. The specific epithet (infecunda) means "unfruitful".

Distribution and habitat

Conservation status
Grevillea infecunda is listed as "vulnerable" under the Australian Government Environment Protection and Biodiversity Conservation Act and the Flora and Fauna Guarantee Act 1988 and the Department of Sustainability and Environment's Advisory List of Rare Or Threatened Plants In Victoria, and a National Recovery Plan has been prepared. The main threats to the species include recreational activities such as the use of off-road vehicles, horse-riding and camping.

References

infecunda
Flora of Victoria (Australia)
Proteales of Australia
Taxa named by Donald McGillivray
Plants described in 1986